The J. J. Kavanagh & Sons Premier Junior Hurling Championship is an annual hurling competition organised by the Kilkenny County Board of the Gaelic Athletic Association since 1905 for the third-tier hurling teams in the county of Kilkenny in Ireland.

The series of games are played during the summer and autumn months with the county final currently being played at Nowlan Park in October. The prize for the winning team is the Bob Aylward Cup. The championship has always been played on a straight knockout basis whereby once a team loses they are eliminated from the series.

The Kilkenny County Championship is an integral part of the wider Leinster GAA Junior Club Hurling Championship. The winners of the Kilkenny county final join the champions of the other hurling counties to contest the provincial championship.

The title has been won at least once by fifty-six different clubs. The all-time record-holders are Mooncoin, John Locke's, Mullinavat, Glenmore, James Stephens, Thomastown and Carrickshock, who have all won the competition four times.

Dunnamaggin were the 2018 winners after defeating Piltown in the championship decider.
Mooncoin are on top of the roll of honour with 7 titles, when they defeated Tullogher-Rosbercon in the 2021 final. Blacks and Whites defeated Windgap in the 2022 final to claim the title.

Top winners

Roll of honour

References

External links
 Kilkenny GAA Bible

Hurling competitions in County Kilkenny
Junior hurling county championships
Kilkenny GAA club championships